Recovery is a studio album by American musician Bobby Conn. It was released on March 20, 2020 under Tapete Records.

Critical reception
Recovery was met with generally favorable reviews from critics. At Metacritic, which assigns a weighted average rating out of 100 to reviews from mainstream publications, this release received an average score of 68, based on 5 reviews.

Track listing

References

2020 albums
Bobby Conn albums
Tapete Records albums